Creve Coeur Airport  is a public use airport in St. Louis County, Missouri, United States. It is four nautical miles (7 km) northwest of the central business district of Creve Coeur. The airport is located in the city of Maryland Heights and is named for Creve Coeur Lake.

This facility is included in the National Plan of Integrated Airport Systems, which categorized it as a general aviation reliever airport. The airport is home to the Historic Aircraft Restoration Museum which has a large collection of airworthy vintage and veteran light aircraft types, mainly from the 1930s.

Facilities and aircraft 
Creve Coeur Airport covers an area of 400 acres (162 ha) at an elevation of 463 feet (141 m) above mean sea level. It has two runways: 16/34 is 4,500 by 75 feet (1,372 x 23 m) with a concrete surface and 7/25 is 3,120 by 220 feet (951 x 67 m) with a turf surface.

For the 12-month period ending December 31, 2019, the airport had 60,476 aircraft operations, an average of 166 per day: 99.2% general aviation, 0.7% air taxi, and <0.1% military. At that time there were 118 aircraft based at this airport: 140 single-engine aircraft, 9 multi-engine aircraft, 1 jet aircraft, and 1 helicopter.

See also 
 List of airports in Missouri

References

External links 
 Creve Coeur Airport, official site
  at Missouri DOT Airport Directory
 Aerial image as of March 2002 from USGS The National Map
 
 

Airports in Missouri
Airports in Greater St. Louis
Transportation buildings and structures in St. Louis County, Missouri